Puli is a 2015 Indian Tamil-language fantasy action adventure film written and directed by Chimbu Deven. The film stars Vijay in a dual role as demon prince and his son a half-demon alongside Hansika Motwani and Shruti Haasan in the female leads. Sudeep features as the main antagonist of the film along with Prabhu and Nandita Swetha in cameo roles. Sridevi features as the possessed evil Queen.

The film's original Tamil version was released worldwide on 1 October 2015. The film was dubbed into both Telugu and Hindi, which were released a day later on 2 October 2015. The film received mixed reviews from critics with praise for the visual effects, cinematography and the performances of the cast but criticized the screenplay and execution.

The story revolves around the clash between humans and demons (Vedhalams) ruled by a demon kingdom in a fantasy world, where a human is fighting for justice for the killing of humans by demons, but his ancestry turns out to be a mystery.

Puli recovered its 100 crore investment through profit in satellite and digital rights.

Plot
Marudheeran (half tiger-demon and half human) is the adopted son of a tribal village chief named Vembunathan. From a young age, he notices the atrocities regularly committed on the villagers by soldiers from the neighbouring kingdom of Vedhalapuram called the Vedhalams, who have supernatural powers. When he becomes an adult, Marudheeran starts to protect the villagers from the Vedhalams, because of which he is well respected by the villagers.

Marudheeran falls in love with Pavalamalli. One day, she is kidnapped by a group of Vedhalams, who then ransack the village and also kill Vembunathan. Marudheeran, along with his close friends Kodangi and Sama, begins a journey to Vedhalapuram. During the journey, Marudheeran rescues Manthagini, the princess of Vedhalapuram, from a panther. That time Princess Manthagini falls in love with Marudheeran. This is noticed by Thalapathy Jalatharangan, the evil-minded demon, Commander-in-Chief of Vedhalapuram. On the pretext of being medicine makers, Marudheeran, Kodangi, and Sama enter the Vedhalapuram palace, where they meet Yavanarani, the cruel Queen of Vedhalapuram who is also a sorceress. She allows them to stay at the palace, and soon Marudheeran wins the support of the Queen and the love of Manthagini with his fighting prowess and resilience. Yavanarani announces the engagement of Marudheeran with Manthagini, and both get married.

Later, Marudheeran finds out that he himself is a half Vedhalam (half demon). Marudheeran was the son of Pulivendhan  (powerful tiger-demon) and Pushpa (human princess), Pulivendhan was the late prince of Vedhalapuram, Yavanarani's younger brother and Manthagini's uncle. When he stood up to Jalatharangan, who used to terrorise the citizens of Vedhalapuram with the help of his henchmen, Jalatharangan killed him and his wife, Pushpa. Marudheeran also finds out that Yavanarani is actually a puppet Queen under the influence of evil magical power emanating from Jalatharangan's ring. Due to the evil magical influence, Yavanarani developed magical powers as well as her tyrannical behaviour. She performs yearly Kanya Puja to boost her magical powers. After Yavanarani performs the Kanya Puja for the 18th consecutive year (this time on Pavalamalli), Jalatharangan has planned to eliminate her and take over the throne.

Marudheeran also finds out that he will transform into a Vedhalam (demon) if he stops taking the demon power suppression medicinal leaf, that he was consuming from his childhood. Marudheeran transforms to a demon and fights Jalatharangan and kills him, avenging his father's death. Still, before he dies, he opens his ring, releasing all the evil magical power so that Yavanarani could continue to rule Vedhalapuram as a tyrantess without his control after his death. Marudheeran realises that the Queen can be returned to normal only if her staff, which is the source of her magical power, is destroyed. Marudheeran and Manthagini find her performing the Kanya Puja on Pavalamalli. After a bitter sword fight with the Queen, he manages to destroy the staff, thus restoring the Queen to her normal self. In gratitude for releasing her from the evil magical influence, Yavanarani makes Marudheeran heir to the throne of Vedhalapuram.

Cast

Production

Pre-production 
Chimbu Deven was reported to be working on a "fantasy film set in contemporary times" in January 2011 for UTV Motion Pictures, and Dhanush was subsequently signed on to play the leading role. The film was titled as Maareesan, with G. V. Prakash Kumar and Kathir signed on as composer and cinematographer respectively. At the same time, the team revealed filming would start in late 2011. Hansika Motwani was confirmed to play the leading female role in the film, while Vadivelu was also reported to be a part of the cast. However, in October 2011, UTV Motion Pictures left the project citing the escalating budget and Aascar Films replaced them as producers. The project later failed to take off, and the actor and director moved on to work on other ventures. During the production of his Oru Kanniyum Moonu Kalavaanikalum (2014) in late 2013, Chimbu Deven restarted preliminary work on the fantasy film and narrated the script to Vijay, who expressed interest in being a part of the project. Subsequently, the project found producers in P. T. Selvakumar, Vijay's press relations officer, and Shibu of Thameen Films, who have previously distributed several of Vijay's films across Kerala. The two producers came together to form a new production house, SKT Films and announced that production would begin after the completion of Vijay's work in AR Murugadoss's Kaththi (2014).

Development 
Although early reports suggested that A. R. Rahman would be the film's music composer, the team later confirmed Devi Sri Prasad had been signed. Natarajan Subramaniam chose to continue his work as a cinematographer with the film, despite his acting success in Sathuranga Vettai (2014), revealing he was excited to work alongside such an ensemble cast. T. Muthuraj was announced as the film's art director and began work alongside his commitments in Shankar's I (2014), while lyricist Vairamuthu also joined the crew. The team also picked five costume designers to take care of clothing for the actors, with Manish Malhotra, Deepali Noor, Chaitanya Rao, Siva and Sai all brought on board. Furthermore, four stunt choreographers were selected to take care of action scenes with international technicians Sang Lin and Pradit Seeluem, brought in to work alongside Sunil Rodrigues and Dilip Subbarayan. National Award winner, R.C Kamalakannan was signed on to be in charge of the film's animations and special effects, PhantomFx, a Chennai-based VFX company known for the movie Indru Netru Naalai, handled most of the VFX shots, and the rest were split among several studios. Chimbu Deven subsequently worked on finalising the script of the film between January and August 2014. Chimbu Deven and cinematographer Natarajan Subramaniam scouted locations in Kerala in August 2014, finalising schedules in Chalakudi and Nelliyampathy.

Casting
In April 2014, reports suggested Kannada actor Sudeep was approached to play a parallel leading role in the film, while contrasting reports noted he would play the lead antagonist. Sudeep later confirmed his participation in the film, adding it would see him in a "first of its kind" role. The team then successfully signed on actress Sridevi to portray a supporting role of a princess in the film, with the actress appearing in a Tamil film for the first time in 29 years.  This was her final Tamil film before her death in 2018. Another senior actor, Prabhu, also signed on after being approached by the director to portray a character role.

Chimbu Deven revealed that the film would feature two leading female roles to appear alongside Vijay. Initial reports had linked Priyanka Chopra and Deepika Padukone to the roles, but high remuneration subsequently meant neither were signed. Shruti Haasan confirmed that she had signed the film in July 2014, making a comeback to Tamil films after a two-year hiatus following 3 (2012). Hansika Motwani was added to the cast after pairing up with Vijay in Velayudham. She portray a princess, the daughter of Sridevi's character. Thambi Ramaiah and Vidyullekha Raman were also selected to portray roles in the film, while comedians Sathyan, Robo Shankar and Imman Annachi joined the team in the first schedule. A press release in early January 2015 added actors Naren, Vijaykumar, Ali, Karunas and Joe Malloori to the film's cast. In April 2015, Nandita Swetha joined the cast to play a small and pivotal role, after Bhavana had turned down the offer. Gayathri Raman stated that she had portrayed Shruti's mother in the film.

Filming
The team began filming on 10 November 2014 at the Aditya Ram Studios on the East Coast Road, Chennai, where a song featuring Vijay and Hansika Motwani was shot in a set replicating a castle put up by art director, T. Muthuraj. The team then set up base in Pannaiyapuram for a forty-five-day stint, with hundreds of extras and technicians gathered from neighbouring states. A second schedule continued throughout December, after which it was reported that the film was twenty per cent complete. After a Christmas break, production restarted in early January 2015, and carried on in the outskirts of the city until mid-January. Reports which suggested that the team had secured permission to film at the Mysore Palace was dismissed by the makers as speculation.

The film had begun shoot without a title and had been widely referred to in the media as Vijay 58. Other titles such as Garuda, the script's original name Maareesan, Maru Dheeran and Por Vaal were also registered by the producers, while finalising on a title. The team consequently confirmed the title as Puli in early January 2015, after having bought the rights from director S. J. Surya.

Music

The film score and soundtrack was composed by Devi Sri Prasad collaborating with Vijay for the third time after Sachein (2005) and Villu (2009). The audio rights of the film were sold to Sony Music India. The album features six tracks, all of them were written by lyricist Vairamuthu.

The song teaser of "Yendi Yendi" sung by Vijay and Shruti Hassan, was released on 24 July 2015. The audio launch event was held on 2 August 2015. The event was telecasted live in YouTube.

Behindwoods rated the album 2.75 out of 5 and stated, "Puli's music will need the grand visuals as it is programmed keeping in mind whats going to come onscreen." Indiaglitz gave the same rating and stated "The album in all is racy but only in parts. The energy, which is typical of DSP seems to have dipped in his snoopiness for the choice of instruments, orchestrina of genres and classic melodies. However, most part of the album sounds just for situational numbers. Let's catch the complete action on the screen."

Marketing
The first look poster was released on 21 June 2015, ahead of Vijay's birthday; and on his birthday, the makers revealed the teaser trailer of the film. However, the teaser was leaked hours before the official release. Despite, its leak the teaser crossed 2 million views within 45 minutes of its release. The promo song teaser of "Yendi Yendi" was released on 24 July 2015, in order to promote the audio launch of the film. The trailer of this film is supposed to be released on 2 August 2015, during the film's audio launch, but it was not confirmed by the makers.

The first trailer of the film was released through YouTube on 19 August 2015. The trailer became the first Tamil film to hit 100k likes, and also became the most liked Indian trailer on YouTube, beating the previous record held by Kick. The trailer also crossed 2 million views, within 49 minutes. In order to promote the film, the makers released a new promo song, featuring the music composer Devi Sri Prasad on 14 September 2015. The second trailer of the film was released on 23 September 2015. The teaser crossed 13 million views with 50k likes. The makers released an action 3D game for Puli on Google Playstore, Windows Store and Apple Store. A 3D game titled Epic Clash was released based on the characters of Puli.

Release

Theatrical
Puli was initially slated to release, coinciding with the Ganesh Chathurthi festival on 17 September 2015. But the release was postponed due to heavy work of computer graphics in the film. The makers finally zeroed on 1 October 2015, as the release date, which also coincides veteran actor Sivaji Ganesan's birthday and also announced that the film would be dubbed and released in Telugu and Hindi languages, both versions released on 1 October 2015 along with the Tamil version.
Tamil Nadu theatrical rights for the film were bought by Sri Thenandal films. Ayngaran International purchased the overseas rights while Thameens purchased the Kerala distribution rights. The Karnataka distribution rights were purchased by the Producer and director S. Narayan. Telugu rights were bought by SVR Cinema. North India release rights were acquired by Pahlaj Nihalani. The film was also released in China and Japan.

Home media
The Tamil, Telugu and Hindi satellite rights of the film were totally sold for 100 crore to Indian TV channels.

Reception

Box office
On the first day, it collected 10.75 crore in Tamil Nadu. It grossed 28.6 crore worldwide on its opening day Thursday. In the second day the film grossed 27.5 crore worldwide. It collected 3.87 crore in four days in Kerala. In the first weekend, the film collected 64 crore worldwide, with 2.84 gross in Chennai city alone beating S.S Rajamouli's Baahubali, as the latter collected only 1.64 crore; and 4.65 crore from Telugu states
However, it is reported according to International Business Times that the film performed poorly in its third week at the box office. The film performed well overseas.

Critical response
The film received mixed reviews and poor ratings from Telugu film critics. Behindwoods praised the production design and visual effects of the film but criticised the screenplay, rating the film 2.75/5. "When Superstars pick such new scripts, there are lots of good things that can happen to cinema. Applause to Vijay for that". The Times of India rated the film 2.5/5, stating "Puli (Tiger) is your Indian cinema version of Gulliver and the Lilliput's fairy tale. A lavishly mounted fantasy adventure, at the core it is basically a love story." Latha Srinivasan of Daily News and Analysis gave the film 2.5/5 stars, deeming the film a "visual treat" with a disappointing screenplay. She praised the cinematography, visual effects and performances of the cast, but criticised the story, noting that the genre might be new for Tamil cinema, but "the story is not something new and it moves at such a slow pace that it gets tiring to watch in places." Koimoi rated the film 2/5, stating "If you are a die-hard Vijay fan then you may but if you are looking for something unique, the film will fail you. It creates an illusion of being smart but in reality, it lacks any kind of logic." Bollywood Hungama rated the film 2/5, writing, "On the whole, PULI is a strictly average fare. Watch it if you are a Sridevi or a Vijay fan. Otherwise, this fantasy is a bore fest."

Saibal Chatterjee from NDTV rated the film 2/5, writing that "Puli gets two stars for ambition and scale, but none for execution." Raja Sen rated the film 1.5/5, writing, "Clearly Puli needs you to make (or carry) your own entertainment." Mumbai Mirror rated the film 1.5/5, writing, "Fantasy films allow defying logic, physics and biology, as long as it fascinates. This one makes a jaded attempt to recreate tested ideas and wages a war against one's brain cells." The Indian Express rated the film 1.5/5, writing, "The bigger the film doesn't always mean the greater it is, and there can't be a better example of this than Vijay's big-budget fantasy drama "Puli", which isn't a bad film, but worse." India Today rated the film 1.5/5, stating "Vijay's fantasy film tries hard to roar but ends up squeaking." Mid-Day rated the film 1.5/5, writing, "Not fair to compare, maybe, but one cannot help it. 'Puli', at best, looks like the poor, underfed cousin of 'Bahubali', the other fantasy film that we were treated to not so long ago. The setting is almost the same. Kings, queens, waterfalls and forests and a newborn child being found in the ocean, but Puli proves that director Chimbu Deven doesn't even remotely share the grand vision of SS Rajamouli's." Gautaman Bhaskaran of Hindustan Times gave the film 1/5 stars saying, "Chimbu Deven could have thought of something better than this juvenile romp into fantasy land."

Both Baradwaj Rangan of The Hindu and S Saraswathi of Rediff.com gave negative reviews. Both critics also stated that several dialogues of Vijay were meant as declarations of political intent. Rangan wrote, "Put differently, Chimbu Deven has forgotten to make a movie for adults." Comparing Puli with Baahubali, another historical fiction film, he said that there was "a sustained commitment to storytelling" in the latter, which was missing in Puli. IBNLive rated the film 1/5, writing "If adventure is your genre, and Sridevi your fantasy, I'll wholeheartedly recommend K. Raghavendra Rao's 'Jagadeka Veerudu Athiloka Sundari' in which Sridevi is joined by Chiranjeevi on a whirlwind tour of fantasy, games, childish humor, action, and terrific music by Ilaiyaraaja. Coming to Puli, it's clearly a case of a misguided shot." Indiaglitz rated the film 2.75/5 and concluded, "Despite some drawbacks and disappointments, 'Puli' ends up as a decent fantasy entertainer that will be especially liked by Children and Vijay who retains his form and charm as always lives up to his mass appeal" DNA India regarded that the film's weaponry, armour, costumes and fighting skills were inspired from Game of Thrones, whereas Vijay and Sudeep's characterisations had resemblances to Jon Snow and Stannis Baratheon.

The film attracted fandom among the younger audience. Baradwaj Rangan of The Hindu writes, "Put differently, Chimbu Deven has forgotten to make a movie for adults. His inventions surprise us, delight us for a second or two – and then we’re back to the turgid story."

In 2015, following the film's overseas success, International Business Times pointed out that Puli is one of the South Indian films that has taken the standard to international level.

Notes

References

External links

2010s Tamil-language films
2010s action adventure films
2010s fantasy adventure films
2010s fantasy action films
2015 films
Indian action adventure films
Indian fantasy adventure films
Films scored by Devi Sri Prasad
Films shot in Chalakudy
Films shot in Kerala
High fantasy films
Indian fantasy action films
Indian pregnancy films
Films directed by Chimbu Deven
Films shot in Thrissur